Shinmoedake is a volcano in Kagoshima Prefecture, Kyūshū, Japan, and a part of the Mount Kirishima cluster of volcanoes. It is believed to have formed between 7,300 and 25,000 years ago. 

Eruptions from Shinmoedake have been recorded in 1716, 1717, 1771, 1822, 1959, 1991, 2008, 2009, 2011, 2017, 2018, 2020 and 2021.

2011 eruptions
The 2011 eruptions began on 19 January. On 26 January, at 7:30 AM, increased eruption activity spewed ash over the surrounding area. The ash closed four railroad lines, and some airline service was cancelled due to heavy ash in the air. It was the largest eruption from Shinmoedake since 1959. On 27 January, the volcano alert level was raised to 3. 

During February 2011, a lava dome formed in Shinmoedake's crater. On February 17, an evacuation advisory was put in place for the Miyakonojo area for 2,500 people after heavy rains threatened to produce lahars, and at least 63 people evacuated.

On 13 March, two days after the 2011 Tōhoku earthquake, the volcano once again erupted. The eruption forced the evacuation of several hundred residents.

2018 eruptions
On 22 June 2018, another eruption occurred, 4 days after a 6.1 Mw earthquake struck Osaka on 18 June, sending smoke and rocks thousands of meters into the air.

Cultural references
Shinmoedake was used as a location in 1967 James Bond film, You Only Live Twice, as the volcano in which the villains' secret rocket base is located.

References

External links

 Kirishimayama - Japan Meteorological Agency 
   - Japan Meteorological Agency
 Kirishima Volcano - Geological Survey of Japan
 

 Explosive eruptions observed. January, 2011 - YouTube
 Mount Shinmoe Video Archive - Volcano Video HQ

Volcanoes of Kyushu
Mountains of Kagoshima Prefecture
Volcanic plugs of Asia
Volcanoes of Kagoshima Prefecture